The Valmiera district was an administrative division of Latvia, located in the Vidzeme region, in the country's north-east. Its administrative center was Valmiera. It bordered Estonia to the north and the former districts of Limbaži to the west, Valka to the east and Cēsis to the south. It was the eighth largest district in Latvia and had a population of 60,345 (2000 census).

Districts were eliminated during the administrative-territorial reform in 2009.

Towns in Valmiera district 
Valmiera
Mazsalaca 
Rūjiena

See also
Kreis Wolmar

Districts of Latvia